Carlos Manuel Echandi Lahmann (October 20, 1900 – August 23, 1938) was a Costa Rican surgeon murdered by Beltrán Cortés. Prior to killing Echandi, Cortés also killed his boss Ricardo Moreno Cañas and would go on to kill one more person and injure two more while escaping from Echandi's house. The crimes were heavily covered by the Costa Rican media at the time.

Family and education

He was born on October 20, 1900 to José Antonio Echandi González and Margarita Lahmann Carazo. He married Julieta Brenes Hine with whom he had four children: Hilda, Olga (who died at a young age), Carlos Manuel and María Elena.

He graduated from Yale University in New Haven, Connecticut as M.D. in 1925 and that same year joined the University of Costa Rica's Faculty of Medicine.

Career 

He joined Hospital San Juan de Dios as an intern in 1926 and in late 1927 was named medical assistant to Dr. Moreno in surgery and orthopedics. On August 25, 1936 he was put on charge of the Doctor Carlos Durán General Service Clinic. As Dr. Moreno's assistant he took part of the surgeries performed on Beltrán Cortés to repair an anterior lesion in his right arm. The procedures did not have the expected results and Cortés would always resent him and Dr. Moreno for having used him, according to him, as a test subject in an experimental procedure. He would even later claim that he had gone to the hospital to get treated for a pain in his leg and that Dr. Moreno took advantage of this to take a graft of bone from his healthy arm for a foreign patient.

He also served as deputy in the Legislative Assembly from 1932 to 1936.

Death 

On the evening of August 23, 1938, Beltrán Cortés went to Dr. Moreno's house and shot him three times. He later headed to Dr. Echandi's house, knocked on the door and was received by the footman. Dr. Echandi was on his way out, as he had heard on the radio the news of Dr. Moreno's death and wanted to go to the crime scene, when Cortés shot him twice from the front gate, although one of them bounced off the door so only one of the shots actually hit him. The bullet perforated his pulmonary artery, killing him.

Both doctors' funerals were held the next day in the Metropolitan Cathedral. The ceremony was assisted by several government officials, members of the Costa Rican high society, and many common citizens.

References

External links 
 Muere un hombre, nace un mito, Historia Visual de Costa Rica, La Nación.com.
 Dr. Ricardo Moreno Cañas, Infocostarica Staff.

1900 births
1938 deaths
Members of the Legislative Assembly of Costa Rica
People from San José, Costa Rica
People murdered in Costa Rica
Costa Rican murder victims
Costa Rican surgeons
Yale School of Medicine alumni
Deaths by firearm in Costa Rica
1930s murders in Costa Rica
1938 crimes in Costa Rica
1938 murders in North America
20th-century surgeons
Victims of serial killers